The Erwin Plein Nemmers Prize in Economics is awarded biennially from Northwestern University. It was initially endowed along with a companion prize, the Frederic Esser Nemmers Prize in Mathematics. Both are part a $14 million donation from the Nemmers brothers, who envisioned creating an award that would be as prestigious as the Nobel prize. Eight out of the past 15 Nemmers economics prize winners have gone on to win a Nobel Prize : Peter Diamond, Thomas J. Sargent, Robert Aumann, Daniel McFadden, Edward C. Prescott, Lars Peter Hansen, Jean Tirole and, most recently, Paul R. Milgrom. 
Those who already have won a Nobel Prize are ineligible to receive a Nemmers prize. The Nemmers prizes are given in recognition of major contributions to new knowledge or the development of significant new modes of analysis in the respective disciplines. As of 2022, the prize carries a $200,000 stipend, among the largest monetary awards in the United States for outstanding achievements in economics.

Awardees
2022: Ariel Pakes, "for his fundamental contributions to the development of the field of empirical industrial organization."
2020: Claudia Goldin, "for her groundbreaking insights into the history of the American economy, the evolution of gender roles and the interplay of technology, human capital and labor markets."
2018: David Kreps, "for his work in game theory, decision theory and finance."
2016: Richard Blundell, "for his important contributions to labor economics, public finance and applied econometrics."
2014: Jean Tirole, "based on his various contributions to economic theory and its application to finance, industrial organization and behavioral economics." (Nobel 2014)
2012: Daron Acemoglu
2010: Elhanan Helpman
2008: Paul R. Milgrom (Nobel 2020)
2006: Lars Peter Hansen (Nobel 2013)
2004: Ariel Rubinstein
2002: Edward C. Prescott (Nobel 2004)
2000: Daniel McFadden (Nobel 2000)
1998: Robert Aumann (Nobel 2005)
1996: Thomas J. Sargent (Nobel 2011)
1994: Peter Diamond (Nobel 2010)

See also

 List of economics awards

References

"Nemmers awards in economics, math announced, Northwestern University NewsCenter, April 22, 2008.
Northwestern University's web page describing the origin of the Prize and biographical notes on Nemmers

Economics awards
Northwestern University
1994 establishments in Illinois